Willi Reimann (born 24 December 1949 in Schwagstorf (Fürstenau)) is a German retired football player and manager.

Reimann played as a young boy in a local club in Rheine, later in the Bundesliga for Hannover 96 and Hamburg, appearing in 287 games, in which he scored 93 goals. After one more season for the Calgary Boomers in the North American Soccer League in 1981, Reimann retired from playing.

As manager he worked for FC St. Pauli, HSV, VfL Wolfsburg, 1. FC Nürnberg and Eintracht Frankfurt.

After being sacked due to the relegation of Frankfurt he moved to the United Arab Emirates to manage Al-Shaab. From November 2006 until March 2007, he managed Eintracht Braunschweig.

Honours as a player
Hamburger SV
 Bundesliga: 1978–79
 DFB-Pokal: 1975–76
 European Cup: runner-up 1979–80
 UEFA Cup Winners' Cup: 1976–77

References

External links
 Willi Reimann at eintracht-archiv.de 
 
 

1949 births
Living people
People from Steinfurt (district)
Sportspeople from Münster (region)
German footballers
Germany B international footballers
Germany under-21 international footballers
German football managers
Hannover 96 players
Hamburger SV players
Calgary Boomers players
Bundesliga players
North American Soccer League (1968–1984) players
Association football forwards
Altonaer FC von 1893 managers
FC St. Pauli managers
Hamburger SV managers
VfL Wolfsburg managers
1. FC Nürnberg managers
Eintracht Frankfurt managers
Al-Shaab CSC managers
Eintracht Braunschweig managers
Bundesliga managers
2. Bundesliga managers
Expatriate football managers in the United Arab Emirates
West German expatriate footballers
West German expatriate sportspeople in Canada
German expatriate sportspeople in the United Arab Emirates
Footballers from North Rhine-Westphalia
West German footballers
West German football managers
German expatriate football managers